The Division II Group A tournament was played in Auckland, New Zealand, from 8 to 14 April 2013. The Division II Group B tournament was played in Puigcerdà, Spain, from 1 to 7 April 2013. The winners of the Division II Group A were promoted to the Division I Group B for the 2014 championships, while the last-placed team were relegated to the Division II Group B. The Group B winners moved up to Group A. The qualification tournament was held from 7 to 9 December 2012 in Izmir, Turkey. Beginning this year, the winners of the qualification tournament has to wait until the following year to play in the Division II Group B.

Division II Group A

All times local (UTC+12).

Statistics and awards

Scoring leaders 
GP = Games played; G = Goals; A = Assists; Pts = Points; +/− = Plus-minus; PIM = Penalties In MinutesSource: IIHF.com

Goaltending leaders 
(minimum 40% team's total ice time)

TOI = Time on ice (minutes:seconds); GA = Goals against; GAA = Goals against average; Sv% = Save percentage; SO = ShutoutsSource: IIHF.com

Directorate Awards
Goaltender: Giulia Mazzocchi, 
Defenseman: Franciska Kiss-Simon, 
Forward: Alexandra Huszák, 
Source: IIHF.com

Division II Group B

All times local (UTC+2).

Statistics and awards

Scoring leaders 
GP = Games played; G = Goals; A = Assists; Pts = Points; +/− = Plus-minus; PIM = Penalties In MinutesSource: IIHF.com

Goaltending leaders 
(minimum 40% team's total ice time)

TOI = Time on ice (minutes:seconds); GA = Goals against; GAA = Goals against average; Sv% = Save percentage; SO = ShutoutsSource: IIHF.com

Directorate Awards
Goaltender: Shin So-jung, 
Defenseman: Ela Filipeć, 
Forward: Ana Ucedo, 
Source: IIHF.com

Division II Group B Qualification

All times local (UTC+2).

References

External links
Official website of IIHF
Complete results at Passionhockey.com

II
2013 IIHF Women's World Championship Division II
2013 IIHF Women's World Championship Division II
2013 IIHF Women's World Championship Division II
IIHF Women's World Championship Division II
World
2013 IIHF Women's World Championship Division II
Women's ice hockey in Turkey
IIHF Women's World Championship Division II
Sports competitions in Auckland
2010s in Auckland
December 2012 sports events in New Zealand
2013 in Catalan sport
Sports competitions in Catalonia
December 2012 sports events in Europe
2010s in İzmir